The Duolbasgaissa Formation is a geologic formation in Norway. It preserves fossils dating back to the Cambrian period.

See also

 List of fossiliferous stratigraphic units in Norway

References
 

Cambrian System of Europe
Cambrian Norway
Cambrian southern paleotemperate deposits